Pavel Gusev may refer to:

 Pavel Gusev (journalist) (born 1949), Russian journalist
 Pavel Gusev (footballer, born 1953), Russian football player and coach